Party Golf is a realtime, multiplayer golf game, developed by Australian game developer Giant Margarita. The game is a multiplayer twist on the popular golf video game genre. The aim is for players to race to the hole, and attempt to be first to sink their ball. The core rules of the game can be customized to allow a variety of different factors to influence winning. The game features a large amount of customization, including support for up to 8-person multiplayer. The game launched for the PlayStation 4 in the PSN EU region on October 4, 2016. A North American PlayStation 4 regional launch occurred on October 26, 2016, with a simultaneous release on Steam. The game launched for the Nintendo Switch worldwide on October 19, 2017, and this version can support up to eight players with individual Joy-Con controllers.

References

2016 video games
Casual games
Golf video games
Nintendo Switch games
Party games
PlayStation 4 games
PlayStation Network games
Ouya games
Video games developed in Australia
Windows games
Xbox One games